The Jackson Boulevard Bridge is a Pratt deck truss, fixed-trunnion, bascule bridge that spans the Chicago River at Jackson Boulevard in downtown Chicago. It was built in 1915 and is 273 feet in length.

References

External links
 
 Jackson Boulevard Bridge Over Chicago River, Illinois Digital Archives

1915 establishments in Illinois
Bascule bridges in the United States
Bridges completed in 1915
Bridges in Chicago
Pratt truss bridges in the United States
Road bridges in Illinois
Steel bridges in the United States